Yohan Toti Traoré (born February 15, 2003) is a French college basketball player for the Auburn Tigers of the Southeastern Conference (SEC). Rated one of the top recruits in the class of 2022, Traore played his senior year of high school basketball at Dream City Christian School in Glendale, Arizona.

Early life and high school career
Yohan Toti Traoré was born on February 15, 2003, in Tours, France, to an Ivorian mother, Mah-bana. He is the oldest of five children. 

Traore relocated to America at 17 to pursue basketball. He originally starred for Prolific Prep of Napa Christian School in Napa, California. He would then attend Dream City Christian School as a senior. He received an invitation to participate in the Nike Hoop Summit, scoring four points for the World Select Team.

Recruiting
Traore was considered the top ranked player in Arizona and one of the top players in the class of 2022 by major recruiting sources. On January 30, 2022, Traore committed to play college basketball for LSU. Following the controversy and subsequent firing of head coach Will Wade, Traore reopened his commitment on March 22, 2022. On March 31, 2022, Traore announced his commitment to play college basketball for Auburn over offers from Gonzaga, Kansas, and Houston. He is one of the highest ranked recruits in program history.

References

Living people
Year of birth uncertain 
Auburn Tigers men's basketball players
2003 births
Auburn Tigers men's basketball players
French men's basketball players
French sportspeople of Ivorian descent
Sportspeople from Tours, France